The Pendergast Elementary School District is an elementary school district in Phoenix, Arizona. It operates 13 schools.

Elementary schools
Amberlea
Calderwood
Canyon Breeze
Copper King
Desert Horizon
Desert Mirage
Garden Lakes
Pendergast
Rio Vista
Sonoran Sky
Sunset Ridge
Villa de Paz
Westwind
Pendgast combined Westwind Primary (K–5) and Westwind Intermediate (6–8) into two schools, Westwind Elementary School combining two schools into one for the 2012/2013 school year.

External links
 Official website

School districts in Phoenix, Arizona
School districts in Maricopa County, Arizona